Lemvig is a municipality (Danish, kommune) in Region Midtjylland on the west coast of the Jutland peninsula in west Denmark.  The municipality covers an area of 516.63 km2, and has a population of 19,398 (2022).  Its mayor is Erik Flyvholm, a member of the Venstre (Liberal Party) political party.

The main town and the site of its municipal council is the town of Lemvig.  The town has a population of 6,966.

The current municipality was enlarged on January 1, 2007 as the result of Kommunalreformen ("The Municipal Reform" of 2007) when the former Thyborøn-Harboøre municipality was merged into the existing Lemvig municipality.

A significant part of its southern border is defined by the waters of Bøvling Fjord, Indfjorden and Nissum Fjord.  A string of islands define the western perimeter of the waters south of the municipality; some of these islands belong to the municipality, and others belong to its southern neighbor, Ulfborg-Vemb.  These waters at the municipality's southern border, encompassing the three fjords, plus Fejsted Kog is a national park.

The Lem Cove (Lem Vig) leads into the town of Lemvig from Nissum Bredning.  Lake Ferring (Ferring Sø) lies north of the town of Ferring.

Locations 

The four largest locations in the Municipality are:

The town of Lemvig

Attractions

 The museum of religious art (Museet for religiøs kunst)
 Bovbjerg Fyr, a light tower at the western coast near Ferring
 Ramme Dige
 Jens Søndergård Museum in Ferring
 Lemvig Museum in the town of Lemvig
 The planetstien ("planet trail") at the edge of Lemvig town shows a model of the Solar System at a scale of 1:1.000.000.000. The model of the Sun, 1.4 metres in diameter, is in a small park on the edge of town. The other planets follow along a path far out of town, represented as small bronze balls on granite pedestals. The outer planet, Pluto, is nearly 5 kilometres away from the Sun.  The trail is part of the Lemvig Museum.

Politics

Municipal council
Lemvig's municipal council consists of 21 members, elected every four years.

Below are the municipal councils elected since the Municipal Reform of 2007.

Notable people 
 Vilhelm Prior (1835 in at Mølgård in Vandborg Parish, west of Lemvig - 1910) a Danish book dealer and publisher

References 

 Municipal statistics: NetBorger Kommunefakta, delivered from KMD aka Kommunedata (Municipal Data)
 Municipal mergers and neighbors: Eniro new municipalities map
 Limfjordscup Big international footballtournament in Lemvig

External links 

 Municipality's official website
 Lemvig tourist bureau (in English, German and Danish)
 Lemvig Gliding Club, the airfield, the district and some history
 Big international footballtournament in Lemvig
 The biggest youth basketball tournament in Denmark

 
Municipalities of the Central Denmark Region
Municipalities of Denmark
Populated places established in 2007